The Ministry of Labour and Social Affairs is a government department of Greece. The incumbent minister is Kostis Hatzidakis, Vice President of New Democracy.

Ministers for Employment and Social Protection (2001–2009)

Ministers for Labour and Social Security (2009–2012)

Ministers for Labour, Social Security and Welfare (2012–2015)

Ministers for Labour and Social Solidarity (2015)

Ministers for Labour, Social Insurance and Social Solidarity (2015–2019)

Ministers for Labour and Social Affairs (since July 2019)

References

External links
  

Government ministries of Greece
Lists of government ministers of Greece
Greece
Labour in Greece